The Making of the Mob: Chicago is an American television miniseries, and the second season of The Making of the Mob, based on the iconic Chicago gangster Al Capone and his rise and fall in the Chicago Mafia. It is produced by Stephen David and premiered on July 11, 2016, on AMC in eight parts.

Plot
Opening Introduction (narrated by Jeremy Davidson, who narrated this season):

Release
The first trailer, released in June 2016, promoted the "8-part premiere event" and a July 11, 2016, release date. It featured the tagline, "They built Las Vegas, but they owned Chicago."

Cast

Main
The Outfit:
 Michael Kotsohilis as Al Capone – The Boss
 Paolo Rotondo as Johnny 'The Fox' Torrio – The Mentor
 Jason Fitch as Tony Accardo – The Enforcer
 Christopher Valente as Paul 'The Waiter' Ricca – The Brains
 Emmett Skilton as Sam 'Momo' Giancana – The Wild Card

Recurring
 Andrew Robertt as Frankie Yale
 Amelia Reynolds as Mae Coughlan
 Andre King as Big Jim Colosimo
 George H. Xanthis as Frank Capone
 Josh Harriman as Ralph 'Bottles' Capone
 Stephen Lovatt as Dean 'Dion' O'Banion
 Kip Chapman as Earl 'Hymie' Weiss
 Jack Barry as George 'Bugs' Moran
 Owen Black as Frank 'The Enforcer' Nitti
 Emmett Skilton as Sam 'Momo' Giancana
 Toby Leach as William Dever
 Cohen Holloway as Jack 'Machine Gun Jack' McGurn
 Ruth Wynne as Anna Torrio

Interviews
Each episode features several interviews from celebrities, authors, historians and political figures.

Deidre Capone – grand-niece of Al Capone, author, Uncle Al 
Laurence Bergreen – author, Capone: The Man and the Era
Jonathan Eig – author, Get Capone, Luckiest Man
William Forsythe – actor, The Untouchables, Once Upon a Time in America and The Mob Doctor
Frank Calabrese – former Chicago Outfit associate
Robert Lombardo – author, Organized Crime in Chicago
John Binder – author, The Chicago Outfit
Rich Cohen – journalist
Karen Abbott – author, Sin in the Second City
T.J. English – author, Paddy Whacked
Vincent Pastore – actor, The Sopranos
John Kass – columnist, Chicago Tribune
John Russick – curator, Chicago History Museum
Frank Cullotta – former Chicago Outfit associate 
Paul Sorvino – actor, Goodfellas
Hillel Levin – co-author, When Corruption Was King
Michael S. Green, Ph.D. – professor, (UNLV) historian and board member with the Mob Museum
Michael Madsen – actor, Donnie Brasco
Oscar Goodman – former mayor of Las Vegas, cameo in Casino
Nathan Thompson – author, Kings: The True Story of Chicago's Policy Kings
David Eisenbach – historian
Robert Grant - former Chicago FBI chief
Billy Drago - author, played Frank Nitti in The Untouchables

Episodes

References

External links

2016 American television seasons
2010s American drama television miniseries
Television shows set in Chicago
Television series set in the 1910s
Television series set in the 1920s
Television series set in the 1930s
Television series set in 1931
Television series set in the 1940s
Television series set in the 1950s
Television series set in 1959
Television series set in 1960
Television series set in 1963
Television series set in 1975
Television series set in 1992
Television series based on actual events
Cultural depictions of Al Capone
Cultural depictions of Johnny Torrio
Cultural depictions of Sam Giancana
Cultural depictions of Frankie Yale
Cultural depictions of Hymie Weiss
Cultural depictions of Bugs Moran
Cultural depictions of Frank Nitti
Works about the Chicago Outfit